Benjamin Ball (20 April 1833 – 23 February 1893) was an English-born French psychiatrist. He was the first "Chair of Mental and Brain Diseases" at the Paris Faculty of Medicine.

Early life

He was born at Naples, to an English father, William Ball, and a Swizz mother, Julie Autran (1807–1852). He was naturalised as French in 1849 and spent the whole of his professional life in Paris.

Medical career

He studied medicine under Jacques-Joseph Moreau de Tours and Jean-Martin Charcot and was an assistant of Charles Lasègue at the Salpêtrière Hospital. During his internat he was Laureate of the Academy of Medicine (Prix Portal, in collaboration with Charcot). He became doctor of medicine in 1862. 

With the support of Jean-Martin Charcot, Ball became to first Chair of Mental and Brain Diseases (Clinique des Maladies Mentales et de l’Encéphale) in the Paris Faculty of Medicine in 18 April 1877, to the detriment of his rival Valentin Magnan. 

In 1881, in collaboration with Jules Bernard Luys, Ball founded the journal L'Encéphale, which the pair directed until 1889.

Alienist work

Ball advocated against psychic disorders being separated from the rest of medicine, stating that "the work of the mind coincides with phenomena of a purely physical".

Written works

Ball is the author of numerous works relating to mental diseases. In 1885, he published a trail-blazing treatrise entitled La morphinomanie, in which he evidenced the toxic effects of cocaine which were not absolutely acknowledged  at the time.

Awards

By decree on 14 July 1880 (declaration: 29 January 1881) Ball was awarded a Knight in France's Legion of Honour.

Personal life

On 2 August 1871, Ball married Suzanne Carrier de Belleuse (1847–1928). They had six children, including Albert Ball (1875–1937).

Death

Ball suffered from ill health for 12 months that prevented him from working as a physician. Ball, who is suspected of having endured a two-year evolution of a cancer, died at his Paris residence on 23 February 1893. In his obituary, he was described as having died of "severe mental strain" due to his illness.. His wife's brother and sculptor, Robert Carrier de Belleuse (1848–1913), made a bronze bust that adorns Ball's tomb in Montmartre Cemetery. In 1898, Albert Ball was admitted to boarding school after the death of his father.

See also

 Legion of Honour
 Legion of Honour Museum 
 List of Legion of Honour recipients by name (B)
 List of foreign recipients of Legion of Honour by name
 List of foreign recipients of the Legion of Honour by country
 List of foreign recipients of the Legion of Honour by decade

References

External links 
 

French psychiatrists
French neurologists
19th-century French physicians
1833 births
1893 deaths
Physicians from Naples
Burials at Montmartre Cemetery
Chevaliers of the Légion d'honneur
French psychologists
British emigrants to France